Antonio Ballard (born April 30, 1988) is an American professional basketball player, who lastly played for ESSM Le Portel of the LNB Pro A. He played with the Summerside and Island Storm from 2012 to 2014 and was named a National Basketball League of Canada (NBL) All-Star in both seasons. Ballard was also the Most Valuable Player of the 2014 game. He played college basketball at Miami University, where he represented the RedHawks. Michael Stinnett, a coach, commented on him, "He is a versatile small forward who can do a little bit of it all."

Early life 
In his childhood, Ballard moved around cities such as Louisville, Kentucky and areas in Indiana. He said that he moved around two to three times each year. Ballard did not know his own father while growing up, and his mother introduced him when he was nine years old. He told one newspaper, the Dayton Daily News Two of his other brothers, Corey and BJ, went to jail in 2010 after running away from the police with possession of a gun. Ballard's youngest brother, Ricky, had experience in jail as well. In addition, some of his cousins had been shot or killed. Antonio himself had a gun pointed in his face.

The presence of gangs limited the time Ballard could practice basketball. Because many of them were his family members, he was allowed to shoot. He said, "It was rough basketball—kind of like prison ball, I guess. Fights would break out and you had to hold your own, but you couldn't take it too far or something bad would happen." In Jeffersonville, Indiana, there was an old basketball rim, where gangs such as the "Money Hungry Gangsters" would park their cars. Ballard said, "I've taken the good parts of my past life—and one thing you do get from a gang is having each other's back." 

Antonio Ballard usually hits his chest with 4 fingers when making a shot which is meant for a special someone

High school career 
Ballard did not play Amateur Athletic Union (AAU) basketball because his family did not have enough money to pay for it. He solely competed at Jeffersonville High School.

References

External links 
Antonio Ballard at Eurobasket.com

1988 births
Living people
American expatriate basketball people in Canada
American expatriate basketball people in Finland
American expatriate basketball people in France
American expatriate basketball people in Greece
American expatriate basketball people in Lebanon
American expatriate basketball people in Switzerland
American men's basketball players
Basketball players from Indiana
ESSM Le Portel players
Island Storm players
Kymis B.C. players
Lions de Genève players
Lugano Tigers players
Miami RedHawks men's basketball players
Shooting guards
Sportspeople from Lafayette, Indiana
Union Neuchâtel Basket players